The 2020–21 Turkish Cup was the 59th season of the tournament. Ziraat Bankası was the sponsor of the tournament, thus the sponsored name was Ziraat Turkish Cup. The winners earned a berth in the play-off stage of the 2021–22 UEFA Europa League, and also qualified for the 2021 Turkish Super Cup.

Competition Format 

Source:

First round
42 Third League teams competed in this round. No seeds were applied in the single-leg round. First and second round draws were made on 2 October 2020. The match schedules were announced on 6 October 2020. The biggest upset was Tekirdağspor (ranked 144th) eliminating Bayrampaşa (ranked 110th). The lowest-ranked team to qualify for the next round was Tekirdağspor (ranked 144th). The highest-ranked team eliminated was Halide Edib Adıvar (ranked 104th).

Source:

Second round 
46 Third League teams competed in this round. No seeds were applied in the single-leg round. First and second round draws were made on 2 October 2020. The match schedules were announced on 6 October 2020. The biggest upset was Tekirdağspor (ranked 144th) eliminating Silivrispor (ranked 98th). The lowest-ranked team to qualify for the next round was Tekirdağspor (ranked 144th). The highest-ranked team eliminated was 1928 Bucaspor (ranked 82nd).

Source:

Third round 
6 Super League, 18 First League, 39 Second League and 23 Third League teams competed in this round. Seeds were applied in the single-leg round. The draw was made on 23 October 2020. The match schedules were announced on 26 October 2020. 5 teams (83%) from Super League, 12 teams (67%) from First League, 22 teams (56%) from Second League and 4 teams (17%) from Third League qualified for the next round. 29 seeded (67%) and 14 unseeded (33%) teams qualified for the next round. The biggest upset was Kocaelispor (ranked 73rd) eliminating MKE Ankaragücü (ranked 18th). The lowest-ranked team to qualify for the next round was Darıca Gençlerbirliği (ranked 101st). The highest-ranked team eliminated was MKE Ankaragücü (ranked 18th).

Teams

Source:

Results

Source:

Fourth round 
14 Super League, 12 First League, 22 Second League and 4 Third League teams competed in this round. Seeds were applied in the single-leg round. The draw was made on 6 November 2020. The match schedules were announced on 9 November 2020. 10 teams (73%) from Super League, 8 teams (67%) from First League, 5 teams (23%) from Second League and 3 teams (75%) from Third League qualified for the next round. 18 seeded (69%) and 8 unseeded (31%) teams qualified for the next round. Biggest upsets were Turgutluspor (ranked 77th) eliminating Denizlispor (ranked 14th) and Darıca Gençlerbirliği (ranked 101st) eliminating Bandırmaspor (ranked 38th). Lowest-ranked team qualifying for the next round was Darıca Gençlerbirliği (ranked 101st). Highest-ranked team eliminated was Denizlispor (ranked 14th).

Teams

Source:

Results

Source:

Bracket

Fifth round 
16 Super League, 8 First League, 5 Second League and 3 Third League teams competed in this round. Seeds were applied in the single-leg round. The draw was made on 27 November 2020. The match schedules were announced on 2 December 2020. 13 teams (81%) from Super League and 3 teams (19%) from First League qualified for the next round. 13 seeded (81%) and 3 unseeded (19%) teams qualified for the next round. The biggest upset were Tuzlaspor (ranked 39th) eliminating Gençlerbirliği (ranked 12th). The lowest-ranked team to qualify for the next round was Tuzlaspor (ranked 39th). The highest-ranked team eliminated was Trabzonspor (ranked 1st).

Teams

Source:

Results

Source:

Round of 16 
13 Super League and 3 First League teams competed in this round. Seeds were applied in the single-leg round. The draw was made on 18 December 2020. The match schedules were announced on 22 December 2020. 8 teams (62%) from Super League qualified for the next round. 7 seeded (88%) and 1 unseeded (13%) teams qualified for the next round. The only upset was Konyaspor (ranked 13th) eliminating Gaziantep FK (ranked 8th). The lowest-ranked team to qualify for the next round was Konyaspor (ranked 13th). The highest-ranked team eliminated was Gaziantep FK (ranked 8th).

Teams

Source:

Results

Source:

Quarter-finals 
8 Super League teams competed in this round. Seeds were applied in the single-leg round. The draw was made on 15 January 2021. The match schedules were announced on 20 January 2021.

Teams

Source:

Results

Source:

Semi-finals 
The draw was made on 15 January 2021. The match schedules were announced on 2 March 2021.

Results

Source:

Final 
The final match schedule was announced on 13 April 2021.

Source:

Top scorers 

As of 18 May 2021. Source:

External links
 Ziraat Turkish Cup – tff.org

References 

Turkish Cup seasons
Turkish Cup
Cup